Antoine Pierre de Clavel (1734 in Toulon – 1797) was a French Navy officer. He served in the War of American Independence.

Biography 
Clavel was born to the family of a Navy captain. He joined the Navy as a Garde-Marine on 6 July 1750, and had a brother also serving in the Navy.

He was promoted to Lieutenant on 1 May 1763, and to Captain on 4 April 1777.

He commanded Scipion at the Battle of the Chesapeake on 5 September 1781, and at the Battle of the Saintes on 12 April 1782. 

He retired on 21 November 1785.

Sources and references 
 Notes

Citations

References
 
 

French Navy officers
French military personnel of the American Revolutionary War